Khalil Taha (13 July 1932 – 27 July 2020) was a Lebanese wrestler.

At the 1951 Mediterranean Games in Alexandria Egypt, Taha won the silver medal in the 73 kg Greco-Roman wrestling.

At the 1952 Summer Olympics, he won the bronze medal in the men's Greco-Roman Welterweight category.

References

External links
Athlete profile at sports-reference.com

1932 births
Lebanese male sport wrestlers
Olympic wrestlers of Lebanon
Wrestlers at the 1952 Summer Olympics
Olympic bronze medalists for Lebanon
2020 deaths
Olympic medalists in wrestling
Medalists at the 1952 Summer Olympics
Mediterranean Games silver medalists for Egypt
Mediterranean Games medalists in wrestling
Wrestlers at the 1951 Mediterranean Games